Forest Hills Central High School is located in Ada Township, Michigan, near Grand Rapids. It is one of three high schools in the Forest Hills Public Schools system. The district also includes Forest Hills Eastern High School (FHE) and Forest Hills Northern High School (FHN).

History

Forest Hills Central High School (originally "Forest Hills High School") became the first high school of the newly formed Forest Hills School District in the fall of 1958. The doors opened in September with only freshman and sophomore students. The first graduating class was 1961.

The school was memorable for its campus style construction consisting eventually of thirteen separate buildings, including an auditorium added in 1977. The classroom buildings were long hallways, which connected five or six individual rooms. Michigan winters were not amenable to the open campus and the constant walks outside from building to building. In addition, the student population continued to grow, and the buildings began to quickly deteriorate.
In 1986, Central High was completely rebuilt with the exception of the auditorium, the gymnasium, the cafeteria, and the art/industrial arts wing, all of which were incorporated into one new building. Since that time, the school has undergone numerous building and remodeling projects.

In 2009, the building underwent a multimillion-dollar construction project that included a new weight room, student and staff parking lots, main office renovation, athletic field entrance, athletic office, classrooms, and a new gym entrance and foyer. Also added to the new gym entrance were heated sidewalks. In 2010, the auditorium was remodeled.

Demographics
The demographic breakdown of the 1,315 students enrolled in 2015-16 was:

GENDER
Male - 49.0%
Female - 51.0%

ETHNIC BACKGROUND

Native American/Alaskan - 0.3%
Asian - 6.2%
Black - 2.5%
Hispanic - 1.7%
White - 85.6%
Multiracial - 3.7%
7.1% of the students were eligible for free or reduced-cost lunch.

Athletics 
Forest Hills Central's athletic teams compete under the "Rangers" mascot. Most teams compete in the Ottawa-Kent Conference White division. Forest Hills Central offers the following varsity sports:

Boys' sports
 Baseball
 Basketball
 Bowling
 Cross-country
 Football – 1994 state runner-up 
 Golf – 1982, 1985, 1987, 1988, 2010 state runner-up, 2009, 2011 state champions
 Hockey
 Lacrosse – 2007 was the first year of competition separate from Forest Hills Northern. Prior to that, the two schools fielded a combined team. 1990 state champions, 2008 runners-up. 2010 Division II State Champions. 2012 Division II State Champions 2013 Division II state runners-up. 2016 State Champions, 2018 Runner Up State Champions, 2019 State Champions.
 Skiing – 1996 state champions
 Soccer – 2004, 2015 state champions
 Swimming and diving
 Tennis – 1998, 2003 state champions, 2001, 2002, 2011 runner-up, 2014 state champions, 2015 state champions, 2016 state champions
 Wrestling

Girls' sports
 Basketball
 Bowling
 Cross-country
 Competitive cheer 
 Field hockey 
 Golf
 Gymnastics
 Lacrosse
 Skiing — 2017 state champions
 Soccer – 2005, 2007, 2008, 2017 state champions, 2003 runner-up
 Softball
 Swimming and diving – 1993, 1994 state champions, 1995, 2007 runner-up
 Tennis – 1985 state runner-up 
 Track and field
 Volleyball – 1986, 1987 state runner-up
 Water polo
 Wrestling – 2020 state champions

Weekend education
The Grand Rapids Supplemental School (グランドラピッズ補習授業校 Gurando Rappizu Hoshū Jugyō Kō), a part-time Japanese school, holds its classes at the high school.

Notable alumni
 Adam Grinwis (born 1992, class of 2010), professional soccer player
 Kyle Visser (born 1985, class of 2003), professional basketball player
 Gretchen Whitmer (born 1971), 49th Governor of Michigan
 Annette Ziegler (born 1964, class of 1982), Chief Justice of the Wisconsin Supreme Court
 Kim Zimmer (born 1955), actress, Guiding Light and Santa Barbara
 Xavier Tillman Sr. (born January 12, 1999) professional basketball player

References

Public high schools in Michigan
Educational institutions established in 1958
Schools in Kent County, Michigan
1958 establishments in Michigan